2003 in professional wrestling describes the year's events in the world of professional wrestling.

List of notable promotions 
These promotions held notable shows in 2003.

Calendar of notable shows

January

February

March

April

May

June

July

August

September

October

November

December

Accomplishments and tournaments

AAA

Ring of Honor

TNA

TNA Year End Awards

WWE

Awards and honors

Pro Wrestling Illustrated

Wrestling Observer Newsletter

Wrestling Observer Newsletter Hall of Fame

Wrestling Observer Newsletter awards

Title changes

NJPW

WWE 
 – Raw
 – SmackDown

Raw and SmackDown each had a world championship, a secondary championship, and a tag team championship for male wrestlers. SmackDown also had a title for their cruiserweight wrestlers. There was only one women's championship and it was exclusive to Raw.

Debuts

Uncertain debut date
Aero Star
 Drew McIntyre
 John Wayne Murdoch
January 31 – Nobutaka Moribe
 June 26 – Daichi Kakimoto
August 1 – Mike Mizanin
August 2 – Mickie Knuckles
 October 11 - Ricochet

Retirements
 Steve Austin (1989–March 2003) (returned to wrestle at Wrestlemania 38)
 Bruce Hart (1972–2003)
 Brian Adams (1986–January 2003)
 Eric Angle (2000-December 2003) 
 Taylor Matheny (2001–2003)
 Nick Mondo (1999-2003) (Returned for a match in 2017)
 Christopher Nowinski (2001-June 24, 2003) 
 Ahmed Johnson (1989-November 2003)

Deaths 

 January 18 - The Original Sheik, 76
 February 3 - Shadito Cruz, 88
 February 10 – Curt Hennig, 44
 March 19 – Hiromichi Fuyuki, 42
 March 20 - Sailor Art Thomas, 79
April 16 - Ray Mendoza, 73
 May 1 – Miss Elizabeth, 42
 June 2 – Freddie Blassie, 85
 August 8 - Giant Ochiai, 30 
 August 24 - Kent Walton, 86
 September 7 - Great Antonio, 75
 September 25 – Anthony Durante, 36
 October 16 – Stu Hart, 88 
 October 19 – Road Warrior Hawk, 46
 October 26 - Floyd Creatchman, 46
 November 6 - Crash Holly, 32
 November 24 - Dick Hutton, 80
 November 29 – Moondog Spot, 51
 December 6 – Jerry Tuite, 36
 December 19 - Mike Lozansky, 35 
 December 26 – Danny Fargo, 44

See also
List of WWA pay-per-view events
List of WWE pay-per-view events

References

 
professional wrestling